"Bombtrack" is a song by American rock band Rage Against the Machine. It is the opening track on their self-titled debut album. Like most of Rage Against the Machine's songs, the song's lyrics discuss social inequality, proclaiming that "landlords and power whores" were going to "burn". The riffs were composed by Rage Against the Machine bassist Tim Commerford. The song is one of three on the album in the key of F along with "Know Your Enemy" and "Fistful of Steel".

A music video was released, depicting support for the Peruvian Maoist revolutionary organization, Sendero Luminoso and its leader Abimael Guzman. The video clip did not appear on the group's first home video, citing Rage's first altered political opinion. In 2003, the video finally appeared as bonus material on their Live at the Grand Olympic Auditorium DVD.

The single artwork features Cuban photographer Alberto Korda's famous image of Che Guevara, Guerrillero Heroico. A mirrored version of the iconic two-tone portrait by Irish artist Jim Fitzpatrick (T-shirt version).
Perhaps the song's most notable appearance outside of the music industry would be its appearance in Oliver Stone's controversial film Natural Born Killers, when Mickey breaks out of his prison cell in search of Mallory.

Live performances

The song made its live debut on March 8, 1992, in San Luis Obispo, California.

The acoustic version of the song was only played live once. This was at the KROQ Acoustic Christmas on December 12, 1993.

The lyrics, "Hardline, hardline after hardline!" are, on occasion, changed to "Hardline after muthafuckin' hardline!" as well as the line during the chorus, "Burn! Burn, yes ya gonna burn!" are occasionally changed to, "Burn! Motherfucker, burn!"

When first recorded in the studio, and during live performances, bassist Tim Commerford sings the chorus with de la Rocha.

Track listing

CD
"Bombtrack"
"Bombtrack [Evening Session version]"
"Bombtrack [live version]"

The 'Evening Session' version was recorded on BBC Radio 1 during Mark Goodier's Evening Session.

7"

 "Bombtrack" – 4:03
 "Bombtrack" (live) – 6:00

Special Pinkpop edition

On June 24, 1994, a special edition of the "Bombtrack" CD single was released for the Pinkpop Music Festival's 25th birthday. This version contains an alternative track listing.

"Bombtrack"
"Freedom" (live)
"Settle for Nothing" (live)
"Bombtrack" [Evening Session version]
"Bullet in the Head" [remix]
"Take the Power Back" (live)
"Darkness of Greed"
"Bullet in the Head" (live)
"Bombtrack" (live)

Tracks three and eight recorded live at Melkweg in Amsterdam, February 7, 1993. Track six recorded live in Vancouver, British Columbia, Canada, April 11, 1993. Track nine recorded live in Minneapolis, United States, April 5, 1993. Track five remix by Sir Jinx.

The Evening Session version of "Bombtrack" is a completely reworked, slower "swing" version of the song with altered lyrics, which later appeared on Evil Empires "Without a Face".

In popular culture
The song was made available for download on May 8, 2012 to play in Rock Band 3 Basic and PRO mode utilizing real guitar / bass guitar, and MIDI compatible electronic drum kits.

In 2017, Stone Sour covered the song as part of Metal Hammer's Metal Hammer Goes '90s compilation album, and appears on the deluxe edition of their 2017 album Hydrograd.

References

External links

1992 songs
1993 singles
Epic Records singles
Rage Against the Machine songs
Song recordings produced by Garth Richardson
Songs written by Tom Morello
Songs written by Brad Wilk
Songs written by Tim Commerford
Songs written by Zack de la Rocha